The Kidd-class destroyers were a series of four guided-missile destroyers (DDGs) based on the . In contrast to their predecessor's focus on anti-submarine warfare, the Kidds were designed as more advanced multipurpose ships with the addition of considerably enhanced anti-aircraft capabilities. Originally ordered for the former Imperial Iranian Navy, the contracts were canceled when the 1979 Iranian Revolution began, and the ships were completed for the United States Navy. They were decommissioned in 1999 and sold to the Republic of China Navy as the Kee Lung class.

History
These destroyers were originally ordered by the last Shah of Iran for service in the Persian Gulf in an air defence role around 1973/74. The original order of six ships was tentatively assigned hull numbers DD 993–998 by the U.S. Navy but it was reduced to four ships after U.S. Congress declined to halt the original production run of 30 Spruance ships. Compared to the preceding Spruance class, they retained the former's anti-submarine capabilities while adding two Tartar-D missile launchers for the Mark 26/Standard anti-aircraft missile system. In order to operate more effectively in the Middle East, they also had four air conditioning plants to the Spruances' three, additional dust separators on their gas turbines' air intakes, and increased water distillation capacity. The Shah was overthrown in the Iranian Revolution, prior to Iran accepting delivery of the ships, causing the United States Navy to integrate the vessels into its own fleet in 1981-82 as the Kidd-class.

On February 3, 1979, the Iranian government canceled the second two ships in the class, signing a memorandum of understanding indicating that they were available for acquisition by the U.S. Navy. On February 21. 1979, the Iranian Prime Minister notified the U.S. government that Iran intended to terminate the contract of the first two ships, officially cancelling delivery on March 8, 1979.

Each ship in the class was named after a U.S. Navy Admiral who had died in combat in the Pacific in World War II:
 was named after Rear Admiral Isaac C. Kidd, who died on the bridge of his flagship, during the attack on Pearl Harbor on 7 December 1941.
 was named after Rear Admiral Daniel Callaghan, who was killed during a surface action at the Naval Battle of Guadalcanal, 13 November 1942, aboard .
 was named after Rear Admiral Norman Scott, who was killed during the same surface action that killed Admiral Callaghan at the First Naval Battle of Guadalcanal, aboard .
 was named after Rear Admiral Theodore Chandler, who died on 7 January 1945, as a result of burns received from a kamikaze crashing into his flagship, the previous day.

Because they were equipped with heavy-duty air conditioning and other features that made them suitable in hot climates, they tended to be used in the Middle East, specifically the Persian Gulf itself. During their service with the U.S. Navy from the 1980s to the late 1990s, the ships were popularly known as the "Ayatollah" class.

In 1988–90, the Kidds received the "New Threat Upgrade", which allowed cooperative engagement with Aegis  cruisers, enabling the cruisers to control the Kidds surface-to-air missiles in flight while the destroyers remained electronically silent. However, the arrival of the Aegis-equipped  destroyers led to the accelerated retirement of the Kidd class.

All four ships were decommissioned from the U.S. Navy in the late 1990s and were initially offered for sale to Australia in 1997 for A$30 million each. The Royal Australian Navy was a strong supporter of buying the Kidd-class destroyers to replace the Perth-class as their air warfare ships. In 1999, the offer was rejected, based on extensive problems the Royal Australian Navy had encountered during the acquisition of two surplus s from the U.S. Navy in 1994. In the early 1990s the Labor government of Paul Keating chose to maintain the Royal Australian Navy's existing Adelaide-class frigates instead of replacing them with the more expensive and much more labour-intensive, but more capable Kidd-class destroyers. Under the succeeding Liberal government of John Howard, in the mid-1990s they commenced the SEA 1390, also known as the FFG Upgrade Project, to improve the Adelaide frigates' capabilities; however, this project ran over costs and was behind schedule.McPhedran, Frigates 'can't go to war' despite $1.4bn upgrade

After the Australian refusal, the four ships were offered to Greece, which also refused.

Sale and reactivation
In 2001, the U.S. authorized the reactivation and sale of all four ships to Taiwan (Republic of China). All four have been transferred to the Republic of China Navy under the Kuang Hua VII program. They were sold for a total price of US$732 million with upgraded hardware, overhaul, activation, and training, and included a reduced missile loadout of 148 SM-2 Block IIIA and 32 RGM-84L Block II Harpoon anti-ship missiles. The reactivation was done in Charleston, South Carolina, by VSE/BAV.

Kee Lung-class destroyers
Following the tradition of ship class naming, ROCN has referred to these vessels as Kee Lung-class destroyers, with the ships named after military ports in Taiwan.

The opposition-led Legislature Yuan originally allocated only enough money to purchase half of the SM-2 missiles that the destroyers can carry; a further purchase of 100 supplemental SM-2MRs was included in the 2007 annual budget to ensure all four ships had a full load of SM-2.

By end of 2008, Su Ao was spotted to have eight HF-3 AShMs installed in place of eight Harpoon AShMs. It has been speculated from 2014 on that a navalized Sky Bow missile system, currently planned for an upcoming shipbuilding programme that involves the procurement of up to 15 general purpose frigates and three or four air defense destroyers, will also be replacing the Standard Missile system on these vessels. No plan for any Mk 26-compatible version of the Sky Bow III missile is ever known to have existed.

Ships in class

Original name: 
Tentative Iranian name: Kourosh
Present name: Tso Ying (左營, DDG-1803); was to be Tung Teh (同德); commissioned on 3 November 2006
Original name: 
Tentative Iranian name: Dariush
Present name: Su Ao (蘇澳, DDG-1802); was to be Ming Teh (明德); commissioned on 17 December 2005
Original name: 
Tentative Iranian name: Nader
Present name: Kee Lung (基隆, DDG-1801); was to be Chi Teh (紀德); commissioned on 17 December 2005
Original name: 
Tentative Iranian name: Anoshirvan
Present name: Ma Kong (馬公, DDG-1805); was to be Wu Teh (武德); commissioned on 3 November 2006

See also
 List of naval ship classes in service
 
 
 
 Type 052D destroyer

References

External links

Kidd-class destroyers at Destroyer History Foundation
"World Navies Today: Taiwan (Republic of China)", Haze Gray & Underway.
"DDG-993 KIDD-class"

 
Destroyer classes